Baigou may refer to:

 Baigou, Fengkai County (白垢镇), town in Guangdong, China
 Baigou, Gaobeidian (白沟镇), town in Hebei, China